Jaffe–Campanacci syndrome is one of the disorders associated with café au lait macules (CALMs).  Presentations may include intellectual disability, disseminated non-ossifying fibromas of the long bones and jaw, hypogonadism or cryptorchidism, or giant cell granulomas of the jaw.

It was characterized in 1958 and 1983.

See also 
 List of cutaneous conditions

References

External links 

Genodermatoses
Syndromes affecting the heart
Syndromes affecting the skin
Syndromes affecting the nervous system